Lava (also known as Lava Bazar) is a town in the Kalimpong II CD block in the Kalimpong subdivision of the Kalimpong district in the Indian state of West Bengal. As it lies in the high altitude, so it is also visible from high altitude towns and villages of East Sikkim, high areas of Bhutan and also from Pakyong Airport. The climate of the town is usually very cold because of high altitude making it a perfect place for tourists during summer season.

Geography

Location

Area overview
The map alongside shows the Kalimpong Sadar subdivision of Kalimpong district. This region is characterized by abruptly rising hills and numerous small streams. It is a predominantly rural area with 77.67% of the population living in rural areas and only 22.23% living in the urban areas. While Kalimpong is the only municipality, Dungra is the sole census town in the entire area. The economy is agro-based and there are 6 tea gardens in the Gorubathan CD block. In 2011, Kalimpong subdivision had a literacy rate of 81.85%, comparable with the highest levels of literacy in the districts of the state. While the first degree college in the subdivision was established at Kalimpong in 1962 the entire subdivision (and now the entire district), other than the head-quarters, had to wait till as late as 2015 (more than half a century) to have their first degree colleges at Pedong and Gorubathan.

Note: The map alongside presents some of the notable locations in the subdivision. All places marked in the map are linked in the larger full screen map.

Description of the place
It is one of the few places in West Bengal to receive snow in winter. It is the entry point to the Virgin Neora Valley National Park from Kalimpong. The route to Lava is scenic with the change in vegetation from tropical deciduous to the wet alpine trees of fir, pine and birch. The verdant forests are a popular spot for picnicking, trekking and bird-watching. Lava has gradually become a favorite tourist destination. Temperature decreases below Zero Degree in Winter and increases up to Maximum 30 Degree Celsius in Summer. It is situated on the trade route to Tibet via the Chumbi Valley. Lava can be reach through Gorubathan from Damdim or Malbazar of Jalpaiguri District. Distance from Gorubathan is 50 kilometres. The Road is Wide, Smooth and full with Scenic Beauty in every turn. The new Road is Built by Border Roads Organisation (B.R.O.) of Defence Ministry of Government of India.

Wild animals such as the Himalayan black bear, Leopard, Wild Boar, Red Panda and barking deer are found in these parts. Some Royal Bengal Tiger was found and captured in Camera here in the Year 2015. A Buddhist Monastery is present on one of the hills of Lava. Notable sites include Changey Waterfalls, Rache-La, Kolakham and Kagyu Thekchen Ling Monastery.

Demographics 
According to the 2011 Census of India, Lava Bazar DIF had a total population of 1,836 of which 945 (51%) were males and 891 (49%) were females. There were 195 persons in the age range of 0 to 6 years. The total number of literate people in Lava Bazar DIF was 1,283 (78.18% of the population over 6 years).

Tourism in Lava 
One of favoured destinations from Lava is Neora Valley National Park. Lava and surrounding area is also a popular destination for bird watchers and butterflies.
Because of cold climate in the town and nearby areas, it is a perfect destination for tourists during summer season. The beautiful National Highway 717A passing through forests, deep valleys, rivers,  and top of the hills, Ambiok and other Tea Gardens, Many sunrise view points, Local Homestay, Kafer etc are the places of interest in lava.

Transport
Lava lies on  National Highway-717A  connecting Bagrakote to Gangtok via Pakyong Airport.

Taxis, Jeeps, Buses etc are available from Labha to cities and towns like Kalimpong, Pedong, Rhenock, Algarah, Malbazar, Gorubathan, Siliguri etc.

The nearest railway station is Malbazar Junction 58 kilometres away, and the nearest airport is Pakyong Airport about 75-80 kilometres and Bagdogra International Airport around 110 kilometres.

Gallery

References

External links
 
About Changey Falls North Bengal Tourism

Hill stations in West Bengal
Villages in Kalimpong district